Pancreatic Cancer Action is a nonprofit organisation based in the United Kingdoms who claims to have a goal of raising awareness for pancreatic cancer.

The organisation was founded by Ali Stunt, who was a pancreatic cancer patient, Pancreatic Cancer Actions main goal is helping those with pancreatic cancer. The organisation has some people in it who were pancreatic cancer patients, or were affected by it.

Pancreatic cancer is the fifth most common cause of cancer death in the UK but receives only 1% of research funds. Only 10% of patients with a diagnosis of pancreatic cancer are able to have potentially curative surgery.

Goal: To improve pancreatic cancer survival numbers.
Focus: To improve early detection methods for pancreatic cancer.
Approach: To increase awareness of pancreatic cancer to the public, the medical community and the government.

One focus is the annual UK Pancreatic Cancer Awareness Month held in November each year.

Having been involved in setting up the very first Pancreatic Cancer Awareness Week in 2009, Ali Stunt then went on to found Pancreatic Cancer Action.

Pancreatic Cancer Action is supported by leading clinicians and researchers in the pancreatic cancer field, along with others whose lives have been affected by pancreatic cancer in some way.

The Team
Alison Stunt – Founder & CEO
Lu Constable - Marketing and Communications Manager
Lucy Delemos - Fundraising Manager
Vicky McLaren - Information and Operations Manager
Lu Constable - Marketing Executive
Gemma Brown - Administration Assistant
Issy Smith - Fundraising Communications Assistant

The Trustees
Phil Stunt – Chair
Helen Matthews – Secretary & Fundraising
Jane McCue – Treasurer
Charlotte Maude – Marketing/PR
Neville Menezes – Consultant Pancreatic Surgeon
Carolyn Scott – Medical Liaison

Medical Advisors
Mr. Ross Carter – Glasgow Royal Infirmary (surgical)
Dr. Seb Cummins – Royal Surrey County Hospital, Guildford (clinical oncology)
Mr. Hemant Kocher – Barts and London (surgical)
Mr. Neville Menezes – Royal Surrey County Hospital, Guildford (surgical)
Dr. Gary Middleton – Royal Surrey County Hospital, Guildford (medical oncology)
Dr. Kevin Shotliff – Chelsea & Westminster Hospital and Brompton Hospital. Royal Marsden Hospital (endocrinology)

Patrons 

Hugh Grant
Joanna David
Dr. Hillary Jones
Nick Hewer

See also 
 Cancer in the United Kingdom

References

External links 
 Pancreatic Cancer Action

Health charities in the United Kingdom
Cancer organisations based in the United Kingdom